Záchlumí is a municipality and village in Ústí nad Orlicí District in the Pardubice Region of the Czech Republic. It has about 700 inhabitants.

Administrative parts
Villages of Bohousová and Litice nad Orlicí are administrative parts of Záchlumí.

Sights
The main landmark of the municipality is the Litice Castle.

Gallery

References

External links

Villages in Ústí nad Orlicí District